Mapado 2: Back to the Island is a 2007 South Korean film and sequel to the 2005 comedy Mapado.

Plot 
Former detective Chung-su takes a secret mission from an aged millionaire who wants to see his first love again before he dies. Knowing only that the woman's name is Kkotnim and that she now lives on Dongbaek Island, Chung-su sets sail only for a shipwreck to leave him stranded once more on Mapado, where five abusive old women gave him trouble two years earlier. Discovering that the former name of Mapado is in fact Dongbaek, he starts to investigate the women's pasts believing that one of them is Kkotnim.

Cast 
 Lee Moon-sik - Chung-su
 Kim Ji-young
 Yeo Woon-kay
 Kim Eul-dong
 Kim Hyeong-ja
 Kil Hae-yeon
 Lee Kyu-han
 Lee Cheol-min
 Nam Ji-hyun
 Kim Soo-mi (cameo)
 Joo Hyun (cameo)

Production 
Mapado 2 was filmed in Yeonggwang and Suncheon, Jeollanam-do.

Release 
Mapado 2 was released in South Korea on 18 January 2007, and topped the box office on its opening weekend with 508,590 admissions. The film went on to receive a total of 1,560,297 admissions, with a gross (as of 25 February 2007) of $8,730,037.

In June 2007, Mapado 2 was screened in the Panorama section of the Shanghai International Film Festival.

Reception 
Kim Tae-jong of The Korea Times stated that, "Overall, the film may not have the cutting-edge humor or well-developed story of the original, but its old fashioned jokes still work. The cast knows how to produce laughter with the minimum of ingredients."

References

External links 
 
 
 

2007 films
2000s Korean-language films
South Korean sequel films
South Korean black comedy films
2000s South Korean films